Vladimir Sergeyevich Uspenski (born 7 February 1989) is a Russian former competitive figure skater. He is the 2007 Golden Spin of Zagreb bronze medalist and competed at one senior Grand Prix event.

He is the younger brother of Alexander Uspenski.

Programs

Competitive highlights
GP: Grand Prix; JGP: Junior Grand Prix

References

External links

 
 Tracings.net profile

Russian male single skaters
1989 births
Living people
Figure skaters at the 2007 Winter Universiade
Figure skaters from Moscow
Competitors at the 2009 Winter Universiade